The Division II tournament was held in Maribor, Slovenia, from March 25 to 31 for Group A. Group B was contested from March 10 to 16 in Seoul, South Korea. In both tournaments the first placed team was promoted and the last placed team relegated, so, the Group B winner moved up to Group A, and the Group A winner moved up to Division I Group B. The last placed in Group A was relegated to Group B.  While the rules stated that the 5th and 6th placed teams in Group B must enter a qualification tournament for next year if more member nations apply to compete, this did not happen. Previously these tournaments were known as Division III and Division IV.

Group A

All times are local UTC+2.

Statistics and awards

Scoring leaders 
GP = Games played; G = Goals; A = Assists; Pts = Points; +/− = Plus-minus; PIM = Penalties In Minutes
Source: IIHF.com

Goaltending leaders 
(minimum 40% team's total ice time)

TOI = Time on ice (minutes:seconds); GA = Goals against; GAA = Goals against average; Sv% = Save percentage; SO = Shutouts
Source: IIHF.com

Directorate Awards
Goaltender: Kristy Bruske, 
Defenseman: Kim Un-ae, 
Forward: Alexandra Huszák, 
Source: IIHF.com

Group B

Statistics and awards

Scoring leaders 
GP = Games played; G = Goals; A = Assists; Pts = Points; +/− = Plus-minus; PIM = Penalties In Minutes
Source: IIHF.com

Goaltending leaders 
(minimum 40% team's total ice time)

TOI = Time on ice (minutes:seconds); GA = Goals against; GAA = Goals against average; Sv% = Save percentage; SO = Shutouts
Source: IIHF.com

Directorate Awards
Goaltender: Shin So-jung, 
Defenseman: Anna Ágústsdóttir, 
Forward: Karolina Pozniewska, 
Source: IIHF.com

Division II B Qualification
The Division II B Qualification was cancelled in August 2011 due to a number of nations declining to participate. The qualification was scheduled to include the following:

References

External links
Group A
Group B
Complete results at Passionhockey.com

II
2012
World
2012 IIHF Women's World Championship Division II
IIHF Women's World Championship Division II
IIHF Women's World Championship Division II